Skyscraper is a 1996 direct-to-video American film starring Anna Nicole Smith.  It was directed by Raymond Martino and written by William Applegate Jr. and John Larrabee. Its plot borrows heavily from the film Die Hard, with Smith taking the lead role.

Plot
Carrie Wink (Anna Nicole Smith) is a beautiful and voluptuous helicopter pilot employed by Heliscort, a company that offers heli-taxi transport to high level clients. She is married to Gordon Wink (Richard Steinmetz), a detective with the LAPD, with whom we see some flashbacks of their relationship.

Fairfax (Charles M. Huber), a ruthless South African criminal mastermind prone to quoting Shakespeare, is intent on collecting a series of four interlocking electronic devices or circuits that can somehow "shift the balance of power in the world." Through deception and violence he has managed to acquire three of the devices.

Carrie, unbeknownst to her, has shuttled two of Fairfax’s goons to the site of one of their exchanges.  The location of the fourth device, tucked away in the Zitex building, an 86-floor skyscraper in downtown Los Angeles, is the scene where most of the drama unfolds as Fairfax sets his sights on securing the last device.

Carrie is again called to pick up a pair of VIPs, who this time turn out to be Fairfax himself and his French assistant Jacques (Jonathan Fuller).  She takes them to the Zitex building, where Fairfax has his band of terrorists take over the entire security system and liquidate the security guards as well appropriate an entire floor. Somehow there seems to be very few people in the 86-floor building.

He meets up with Cranston (Eugene Robert Glazer), the possessor of the fourth device. As with the previous three deliverers of the devices, Fairfax plans on killing him. Cranston is mortally wounded in a shootout.  Before entering the building, Cranston had suspected trouble, so his companion went in unseen.  Before he dies, Cranston escapes with the suitcase holding the device and meets up with Carrie, who helps him up to the roof. He gives her the suitcase and admonishes her to keep it away from Fairfax at all costs.

Carrie is hotly pursued over the roof by a muscular goon. With no way out but over the top, she jumps into a window washer's rig. She attaches herself to a steel winch cable and drops many floors down the side of the building at the speed of gravity until she is brought to a halt by the end of the cable.  Now, suspended and dangerously vulnerable to the gunman on the roof, who is shooting repetitively at her, she avoids being shot by constantly swinging around. Carrie finally crashes through a window just as the gunman destroys the winch with machine-gun fire, causing the cable to break free.

Carrie hides the suitcase in a trash trolley. She finds a young boy playing on his toy bike and protects him (the boy's mother has been shot previously; she was blonde and was mistaken for Carrie earlier). Carrie meets up with a small but comically gung-ho security guard and asks for his gun. Now armed, she proceeds back to the floor where she knows that hostages have been taken.

Carrie helps confuse the terrorist operating the surveillance cameras by lighting fires in the waste paper bins, causing the fire system to alert the LA fire brigade as well as disabling some monitors. Fairfax and his gunmen capture her and offer the freedom of the hostages for the location of the suitcase. Carrie witnesses a male hostage killed in cold blood by the female terrorist, after he attempts to exchange his own freedom for the $100,000 he has stolen from the building's computer accounts. Carrie reveals the location of the suitcase and is taken into a room by a guard with an obvious sexual intent.

Carrie's LAPD officer husband, Gordon (Richard Steinmetz), has been investigating the strange goings-on around town. He heads for Zitex (not knowing his wife is also there) and coincidentally stumbles upon his wife's mobile phone. Fearing for his wife’s safety, Gordon leads Fairfax’s men on a chase around the building. The Guard attempts to rape Carrie, who stabs him in the leg with a letter opener and shooting him dead.

Now she comes up behind Natasha the terrorist (Deirdre Imershein) and ruthlessly shoots her in the back, freeing the hostages. A previous flashback of Carrie shooting a handgun with her husband shows her to be an expert shot. This flashback also takes the liberty of showing her second sex scene; the first shows her naked in the shower and then in bed with her husband. Her other physical skills—in combat—are still to be revealed.

Gordon is being physically beaten up by a terrorist who is expert in hand-to-hand combat but is rescued by his wife. Fairfax finally finds the device, kills his right-hand man Jacques and heads for the roof, hoping to coerce Carrie at gunpoint into flying him out. He has not bargained on Gordon also being there (Gordon also has the young boy in tow). Gordon is shot in the shoulder. Carrie knocks the gun from his hand and engages Fairfax with swift kicks and punches which sends Fairfax falling to his death from the 86-story skyscraper to the street down below.

The young boy is reunited with his blonde mother, who has not been killed after all, as an injured Carrie and her husband enter an ambulance.

Cast
Anna Nicole Smith: Carrie Wink 
Richard Steinmetz: Gordon Wink 
Branko Cikatić: Zarkov 
Calvin Levels: Hakim 
Jonathan Fuller: Jacques 
Lee de Broux: Captain Wood 
Deirdre Imershein: Natasha
Charles M. Huber: Fairfax 
Deron McBee: Leidermeier 
Vincent DePalma: Johnny Hill 
Alan Brooks: Booker 
Gary Imhoff: Dudley 
Bob McCracken: Williams 
Eugene Robert Glazer: Cranston 
Seth Isler: Clancy

References

External links

1996 direct-to-video films
1996 films
Direct-to-video action films
1990s English-language films
American action films
American direct-to-video films
1990s American films